Betty Lee Babcock (March 11, 1922 – August 4, 2013) was an American businesswoman, politician, and the wife of the Governor of Montana Tim M. Babcock. She served as the First Lady of Montana from 1962 to 1969, as a delegate to the 1972 Montana Constitutional Convention, and as a member of Montana House of Representatives from 1975 to 1977.

Early life
Born in Aplington, Iowa, on March 11, 1922, Babcock moved to Montana in 1926. She went to Dawson County Junior College. On September 21, 1941, she married Tim M. Babcock, who joined her father's trucking business which later became: Babcock & Lee.

Career
In 1962, Babcock became Montana's first lady when her husband, then lieutenant governor, became governor upon the death of Donald Nutter. From 1969 to 1971, Babcock served as director of the Helena Chamber of Commerce. The Babcocks opened the Colonial Inn in Helena in 1970, and Betty managed it. Betty Babcock was elected to and served in the Montana Constitutional Convention of 1972, one of 100 delegates drafting a new Montana Constitution. Beginning in 1975, she served in the Montana House of Representatives as a Republican. In 1978, Babcock and her husband wrote 'Challenges: Above & Beyond.' Babcock served as chair of the Montana Capitol Restoration Foundation.

Death and legacy
Babcock died in Helena, Montana on August 4, 2013, at the age of 91. Governor Steve Bullock ordered all U.S. and state flags in Montana to fly at half staff until August 8 in her memory.

References 

1922 births
2013 deaths
First Ladies and Gentlemen of Montana
Republican Party members of the Montana House of Representatives
Women state legislators in Montana
Businesspeople from Montana
Writers from Iowa
Writers from Montana
People from Butler County, Iowa
People from Dawson County, Montana
20th-century American businesspeople
20th-century American women
21st-century American women